The 1977–78 Segunda División season saw 20 teams participate in the second flight Spanish league. Real Zaragoza, Recreativo de Huelva and Celta de Vigo were promoted to Primera División. Real Oviedo, Córdoba CF, CD Tenerife and CF Calvo Sotelo were relegated to Segunda División B.

From this season, immediately below Segunda División there is a new league Segunda División B. Thus, Tercera División became the fourth level in the Spanish football pyramid.

Teams

Final table

Results

Pichichi Trophy for top goalscorers

External links 
  Official LFP Site

Segunda División seasons
2
Spain